The Glenshesk River is a river in County Antrim, Northern Ireland. It runs through the Glenshesk valley, one of the  Glens of Antrim, and enters the sea at Ballycastle.

References
http://ballycastleanglingclub.com/Glenshesk.html

Rivers of County Antrim
Northern Ireland coast and countryside